The Diego de Ocampo is the highest point in the Cordillera Septentrional in Santiago Province, Dominican Republic.

Etymology 
This peak was named after Diego de Ocampo, a rebel slave leader who hid away in the mountains, pillaged and sabotaged plantations in Concepción de la Vega, San Juan de la Maguana, Azua de Compostela and Bahoruco. He made a truce with the Spanish authorities, but rebelled again soon after. Later on he was captured and executed by Spanish troops, according to Governor Cerrato and the Oidor Grajeada in 1546.

References

Geography of the Dominican Republic
Mountains of the Dominican Republic